Sports Athlétiques Thiernois Football is a French association football club founded in 1935. They are based in the town of Thiers, Puy-de-Dôme and their home stadium is the Parc des Sports Antonin Chastel. The first team was relegated from 2019–20 Championnat National 3 and now play in Régional 1, the sixth tier of the French football league system.

References

Thiers
1935 establishments in France
Sport in Puy-de-Dôme
Football clubs in Auvergne-Rhône-Alpes